"Riptide" is a song by Australian singer-songwriter Vance Joy. It was first released as a track on his debut EP God Loves You When You're Dancing (2013), serving as its second single, and is also featured on his debut studio album Dream Your Life Away (2014). The song was written by Joy, who also produced it with drummer Edwin White. The upbeat song has been lyrically described as a "coming of age love story" and is known for its metaphors and pop culture references.

The song received positive reviews from music critics, who praised its lyrics, vocals and production and drew comparisons to singer-songwriters Paul Kelly and Jeff Buckley. "Riptide" would go on to have commercial success in Australia, peaking at number six on the ARIA singles chart and subsequently being named the number one song in radio station Triple J's Hottest 100 of 2013. The following year, "Riptide" also peaked at number ten in the United Kingdom and entered Billboards Alternative Songs chart, peaking at number 1. By May 2015, it was the second longest charting single still in the US Billboard Hot 100, appearing on that list for 43 weeks (at number 42 from its peak of number 30).

In May 2015, it was announced that "Riptide" had become the longest-charting song in ARIA Chart history, having remained in the top 100 for 107 weeks and counting. It surpassed the previous record of 106 weeks, held by "Poker Face" by Lady Gaga. In January 2016, the week count was at 120.

As of January 2018, the single has worldwide sales over 6,000,000. That month, as part of Triple M's "Ozzest 100", the 'most Australian' songs of all time, "Riptide" was ranked number 94.

Background
The song's first few chords and opening two lines were originally written at Joy's Glen Iris, Melbourne, home in 2008—the same song title was used, but he initially shelved the song. Years after his experience in university and a VFL career, Joy started doing open mic gigs in Melbourne, Australia, which eventually led to a legitimate music career.

When recording the song in 2012, a year before the EP came out, Joy was writing a song that reminded him of the shelved "Riptide" draft from 2008—he then combined the 2008 effort with his current project at the time. A rough version of the song was uploaded on his personal Facebook account. Although the singer uploaded "...just the first verse and chorus," the encouraging response from Joy's friends and family encouraged him to persist with his music. Joy initially recorded and produced the song with drummer Edwin White in just one afternoon at Red Door Studios, in the Melbourne suburb of Brunswick. Additional production was subsequently completed by John Castle. In an interview, Joy said the title of the song came from a motel of the same name he used to go to with his family when he was a child.

Composition
"Riptide" is an indie folk, folk-pop, and alternative rock song composed in the key of C♯ major with a tempo of 100 beats per minute.

Chart performance
"Riptide" made its first chart appearance at 75 on the ARIA Singles Chart on 29 April 2013, later making its top 50 debut at 41 on 23 June. The song became a top 10 hit when charting at 10 on 28 July, peaking at number 7. For the remainder of the year, "Riptide" remained at the top 40 until on 2 February 2014, the song charted to a new peak of 6 from 35 in response to the song placed on the top of the Hottest 100 of 2013.

The song holds the record for the most weeks in the top 100 of the ARIA Singles Chart (120 consecutive weeks), breaking the records previously held by Lady Gaga's "Poker Face" (106 weeks) and The Black Eyed Peas' "I Gotta Feeling" (105 weeks), both of which were in non-consecutive runs. Worldwide, the single has sold over 1 million copies.

Music video
A music video to accompany the release of "Riptide" was first released onto YouTube on 2 April 2013, at a total length of three minutes and twenty-five seconds. The video, directed by Dimitri Basil and co-directed by Laura Gorun, artistically depicts the song word for word. It was nominated for Best Video at the ARIA Music Awards of 2013.

Critical reception

Hannah Gilchrist of the Red Magazine says "...it feels like you should be sitting on a California beach drinking a bottle of beer while your friends frolic in the waves – no surprise it's inspired by the tracks of the 70s."

Covers
A live version of "Riptide" was covered by South African artist Van T on her EP, Tides, which was released in 2013.
Gossling, a folk/pop singer-songwriter from Melbourne, Australia, also recorded a version of "Riptide" in 2014.
Taylor Swift performed a piano-based version of the song on BBC Radio 1's Live Lounge segment on 9 October 2014. That version of the song consists of a piano, electric organ, shaker, and acoustic guitar.
Grace VanderWaal covered the song on multiple occasions, most notably during her Honda Stage performance at Brooklyn Art Library in 2018.
MisterWives, an indie rock band, also recorded a version of "Riptide" in 2014.
Christian Leave (born Christian Akridge) covered this song in 2015.

In popular culture
The song is featured in the 2014 film The Inbetweeners 2, the TV series Stalker episode 8, and in episodes of Grey's Anatomy, Hawaii Five-0, Neighbours and Home and Away.

The song is also used in the advertisements for Medibank and Irish Life Assurance Plc.

It was also used by Toyota in 2020 for a series of TV ads.

Performances
Vance Joy performed "Riptide" at the ARIA Music Awards of 2013 in Star Event Centre. Quentin Alexander performed "Riptide" on the season 14 finale of American Idol on 13 May 2015.

Tour

On 17 June 2013, Joy announced the Riptide Tour, his second as a solo artist. Before that, Joy was the opening act, between May and June, for the American singer Lissie's tour of the United States, on 27 July he appeared at the Splendour in the Grass in New South Wales and on 7 August he presented at the Edmonton Folk Music Festival in Canada. The tour began on 14 August 2013 in Adelaide, Australia at the Jive Bar and continued until 26 October 2013 in Paris, France. The following month and due to demand, Joy added more dates to his tour. During this period, he also opened for the Australian singer Bernard Fanning's Departures Tour on some dates and opened for Tom Odell on some dates during his tour in the United States.

Set list
This set list is from the show on 12 October 2013, in Manchester. It is not intended to represent all concerts for the tour.

 "Emmylou"
 "From Afar"
 "Red Eye"
 "Dancing In The Dark"
 "All I Ever Wanted"
 "Wasted Time"
 "Snaggletooth"
 "Play With Fire"
 "Riptide"

Shows

Festivals and other miscellaneous performances
This concert was part of the "North West Festival"
This concert was part of the "CityFolk Festival"
This concert was part of the "Winnipeg Folk Festival"
This concert was part of the "Rifflandia Music Festival"

Track listings

Digital download
 "Riptide" – 3:24
 "From Afar" – 4:24

Digital download (remix)
 "Riptide" (FlicFlac Remix) – 5:39

Germany CD single
 "Riptide" – 3:24
 "Emmylou" – 4:40
 
 "Snaggletooth" – 5:19
 "From Afar" – 4:24
 "Riptide" (FlicFlac Edit) – 5:39

United Kingdom digital download EP
 "Riptide" – 3:24
 "Play with Fire" – 4:23
 "Snaggletooth" – 5:19
 "Emmylou" – 4:40
 "From Afar" – 4:24

Charts

Weekly charts

Year-end charts

Decade-end charts

Certifications

Release history

See also
 List of Australian chart achievements and milestones
 List of best-selling singles in Australia
 List of songs which have spent the most weeks on the UK Singles Chart

References

2013 singles
2013 songs
APRA Award winners
Vance Joy songs
Infectious Music singles
Songs written by Vance Joy